The Yale Precision Marching Band (affectionately known as the YPMB, or more simply The Band, for short) is the official marching band of Yale University. It is a scatter band (what some peers might call a "scramble band"), as distinct from university marching bands that emphasize precise movements and geometric field formations. Band members refer to themselves as "The Members Of...", which is derived from their introduction at Yale events.

About The Band

Aside from Director Thomas C. Duffy and Business Manager Stephanie Theodos Hubbard, the band is largely student-run.
 The Drum Major conducts the band during rehearsals and at games. The current Drum Major is Brook Smith, JE '25. 
 The Manager works closely with the Drum Major to organize performances and events on-and-off campus and ensure the well-being of the group. The current Manager is Cody Uman, MC '25. 
 The Script Writer guides a production team that writes each week's halftime show. The current Script Writer is Jerell King, BF '24.
 The Student Arrangers (STUDs) head the Musicological Junta, the student team that arranges music for the shows. The current STUD is Rory Bricca, ES '26.
 The Social Chair plans social gatherings and bonding events for the band outside of performances. They work to create a comfortable environment for everyone in the band. The current social chairs are Risha Chakraborty, SY '25, and Emily Borr, PC '25.
 The Media Specialist documents the band's adventures through photos and videos. They post photos of the band on Facebook and they have control over the band's Twitter, Instagram, and TikTok. The current Media Specialist is Shell Ross, GH '26.
 The band consists of five sections, the leaders of which assist the Drum Major and Manager in the running of the band.  They also lead sectionals and provide section morale. The current section leaders are Aislinn Kinsella (Woodwinds), MC '24; Isaac Oberman (Saxes), DC '26; Shell Ross and Jeremy O'Neill (Brass), GH '26 and M'Div '24; Annette Forchoh (Squaaangs), TC '25; and June Lee and Emily Hettinger (KBB), GH '26 and PC '26.
The Announcer announces and performs the halftime shows during football games, and works closely with Mark Ryba, the play-by-play announcer for Yale football. The current announcer is Janice Dean, TD '23.

Notable stunts
In October 1985, six YPMB members were suspended after dropping their pants at halftime during the Yale-Holy Cross game. Only one week earlier, the band was forbidden by West Point officials from performing its halftime show during the Army-Yale game for the script's insinuation that certain government officials were communists. The following season, in the Yale-Army game at New Haven, the YPMB took the unusual step of marching in straight lines for several minutes before breaking into its usual scatter formations. (NYT 10/7/86, B4) Before the band left the field, members removed their blue blazers on the field, spelling out "USA."

Repertoire
  Bulldog, Eli Yale words and music by Cole Porter class of 1913
  Bright College Years (the unofficial alma mater of Yale University) words by Henry Durand in 1881 to the music of Die Wacht am Rhein 
  Down the Field (march two step) words by Stanleigh P. Friedman; arranged by G.L. Atwater, Jr.;  published in 1905 by the Chas H. Loomis Company (New Haven, CT)
  Yale Boola, Boola (march) words and music by A. M. Hirsh; arranged by G. L. Jr. Atwater; Original Copyright 1906 by Leo Feist
  Yale College Life words by T. Herbert Reed; arranged by J.C. Heed; Original Copyright: 1903 By: Reed, Dawson & Co.
  Sons of Yale: Here's to Good Old Yale Alternative title March Blue arranged by JL Lake; Original Copyright: 1917 by Carl Fischer

The Band's repertoire includes hundreds of songs arranged by the YPMB Junta, the Band's own syndicate of arranger-transcribers. These dedicated and talented folks manage to add more than 30 pieces to the Band music library every year. The YPMB runs the gamut of genres, from Hip Hop to Techno, Pop to R&B, and, of course, plenty of straight Rock.

References

External links
Yale Precision Marching Band
Yale University

College marching bands in the United States
Precision Marching Band
Scramble bands
1917 establishments in Connecticut